VIPs is a 2010 Brazilian drama film directed by Toniko Melo, based on the book VIPs - Histórias Reais de um Mentiroso by Mariana Caltabiano, about Marcelo Nascimento Rocha, a criminal who was famous for impersonating several people, among them one of the owners of the Gol airline and one of the leaders of the PCC criminal faction.

It is the first film of Toniko Melo alone in the direction. His other film, Som e Fúria (2008), was directed in partnership with Fernando Meirelles, which is one of the producers of VIPs. The film was exhibited at the Festival do Rio and won four awards, including best picture.

Plot
The film tells the story of Marcelo da Rocha (Wagner Moura), a man who as a child loved to imitate people. He lives in the state of Paraná with his mother, a hairdresser, and his great dream is to learn to fly and become a pilot like his father.

Marcelo runs away from home and travels to Mato Grosso do Sul. There, he starts working in a hangar, learning to fly airplanes and soon begin working with contraband, always assuming new identities. After getting a lot of money, Marcelo prepares for the biggest coup of his life: posing by businessman Henrique Constantino, brother of the owner of Gol airline.

He disembarks in a resort in Recife and convinces all the VIPs of the party for a few days that is the real Henrique. Except for the millionaire Sandra, who knows his secret, but let herself be seduced by him. All goes well until Marcelo gives an interview on TV, being unmasked and forced to escape.

Cast 
Wagner Moura as Marcelo da Rocha "Bizarro"
Gisele Fróes as Silvia
Jorge D'Elía as Boss
Emiliano Ruschel as Fausto
Roger Gobeth as Renato Jacques
Juliano Cazarré as Baña
Arieta Corrêa as Sandra
Norival Rizzo as Father of Marcelo
João Francisco Tottene as Marcelo da Rocha (child)
Amaury Jr. as Amaury Jr.
Marisol Ribeiro as Resort lady

Accolades 
The film won the 2010 Festival do Rio in the categories of best film, best actor, best supporting actor and best supporting actress. In addition, it participated in the Mostra de São Paulo, Show Búzios, Festival de Vitória and the Mostra de Cinema de Tiradentes.

References

External links
 
 

2010 films
2010 biographical drama films
2010 crime drama films
Biographical films about fraudsters
Brazilian biographical films
Brazilian crime drama films
Crime films based on actual events
Drama films based on actual events
Films about con artists
Films about identity theft
Films based on biographies
Cultural depictions of Brazilian men
Cultural depictions of fraudsters